UMY may refer to:

 Muhammadiyah University of Yogyakarta, a private university under affiliation of Muhammadiyah in Yogyakarta, Indonesia
 UMY, the IATA code for Sumy Airport, Sumy Oblast, Ukraine